This is a list of notable indie pop artists. Bands are listed by the first letter in their name (not including the words "a", "an", or "the"), and individuals are listed by last name.

0-9

+/-
14 Iced Bears
The 1975

A

B

C

D

E

F

G

H

I

J

K

L

M

N

O

P
{{columns-list|colwidth=15em|
The Pains of Being Pure at Heart
Pale Saints
Pale Waves
Owen Pallett
Papas Fritas
Papercuts
Paperplane Pursuit
Paper Route
PAS/CAL
Passenger
Passion Pit
The Pastels
Pavement
Peachcake
Peach Pit
Pedro The Lion
Perfume Genius
Pernice Brothers
Peter, Bjorn and John
Kim Petras
Phoenix
PHOX
The Pillbugs
PinkPantheress
The Pipettes
Los Planetas
Playradioplay!
Dawid Podsiadło
Pogo
Caroline Polachek
Emma Pollock
Pomplamoose
Pony Club
Pony Up!
The Pooh Sticks
The Popguns
The Postal Service
The Postmarks
Primal Scream
The Primary 5
The Primitives
The Promise Ring
Puffy AmiYumi
Purity Ring
PVRIS
Post Sex Nachos

R

S

T

U

V

W

X

Y

Z

See also
List of indie rock artists
List of alternative rock artists

References

Lists of musicians by genre